Jiří Rosický may refer to:
 Jiří Rosický (footballer, born 1948), Czechoslovak footballer
 Jiří Rosický (footballer born 1977), Czech footballer, son of the above